The women's 400 metre freestyle competition at the 2002 Pan Pacific Swimming Championships took place on 25 August at the Yokohama International Swimming Pool.  The last champion was Brooke Bennett of US.

This race consisted of eight lengths of the pool, with all eight being in the freestyle stroke.

Records
Prior to this competition, the existing world and Pan Pacific records were as follows:

Results
All times are in minutes and seconds.

Heats
The first round was held on 25 August.

Final 
The final was held on 25 August.

References

2002 Pan Pacific Swimming Championships
2002 in women's swimming